The following is a list of notable events and releases that happened in 1994 in music in South Korea.

Debuting and disbanded

Debuting groups
Cool
Roo'ra
Toy
Two Two

Soloists
Kim Jin-woo
J.Y. Park
Yoon Do-hyun

Disbandments

Releases in 1994

January

February

March

April

May

June

July

August

September

October

November

December

References

South Korea
Music-related lists
South Korean music